A number of ships have been named Polaris:

Ships and boats
 , a 2016 Finnish icebreaker
 , a 1930 motor yacht that later became the U.S. Navy patrol vessel 
 , listed on the National Register of Historic Places listings in San Mateo County, California
 , a 1968 Russian-owned passenger ship built in Denmark; also known variously as Brand Polaris (2001–2003) and Viking Polaris (2003–2005)
 , a Norwegian sealer shipwrecked in 1942
 , a Swedish Royal Navy shipname
 , a 1909 Swedish Royal Navy 
 , a Swedish Navy torpedo boat, later converted into a sailing yacht; see List of torpedo boats of the Swedish Navy
 , a Royal Australian Navy trawler survey tender
 , a U.S. Navy shipname
 , a steamer sunk in 1872 on an Arctic expedition
 , a freighter built in 1938

Ship and boat classes
 Polaris surveillance vessel, see List of Japan Coast Guard vessels and aircraft

Ship and boat makers
 Polaris Motor, an Italian company
 Polaris Inc.,  a U.S. company

See also
 Polaris (disambiguation)
 Polaris AM-FIB, an Italian amphibious flying boat design
 Polaris FIB, an Italian flying boat design
 , a British Royal Navy trawler; see List of requisitioned trawlers of the Royal Navy (WWII)
 , a cargo ship